Khuru  is a town in Punakha District in central-western Bhutan. Khuru literally means "Darts" in Bhutan.

At the 2005 census, its population was 2,292.

References 

Populated places in Bhutan